The 2005 season is the 55th year in Guangzhou Football Club's existence, their 41st season in the Chinese football league and the 15th season in the professional football league.

Chinese football clubs 2006 season
Guangzhou F.C. seasons